Japanese gunboat Sumida may refer to:

 , an Imperial Japanese Navy gunboat launched in 1903 and stricken in 1935
 , an Imperial Japanese Navy gunboat launched in 1939 that was given to China after World War II and then served in the Republic of China Navy as Chang Hsi and later in the People's Republic of China′s navy as Fu Jiang

Japanese Navy ship names
Imperial Japanese Navy ship names